The Elqui Valley is a wine region centered on Elqui River in northern Chile. The Elqui Valley Denomination of Origin (DO) is defined by the Chilean appellation system, the legally defined and protected geographical indication used to identify where the grapes for a wine were grown. The region lies 400 km (250 mi) north of Santiago, at the southern end of the Atacama Desert in the Coquimbo region. It is known for producing table grapes and other fruits, as well as pisco brandy, Chile’s most popular liquor. It is considered the most commercially viable wine-producing region of northern Chile.

The region’s vineyards extend from the Pacific Ocean in the west to the Andes Mountains in the east, and rise to an elevation of 2,000 meters above sea level (6,500 feet). Wine production began in the Elqui Valley in the 1990s when Chilean wine producers began to look at potential viticulture sites outside the Chilean Central Valley. Since then,  of vines have been planted, mostly along the River Elqui valley, where grape growers have access to high-quality water for irrigation.

Grape distribution by varietal

References

Wine regions of Chile